The Very Best of Little Milton is a compilation album by American musician Little Milton released on Concord Records. The album is part of Stax's Very Best Series.

Allmusic review by Al Campbell says: "This set is aimed at the casual listener and includes such R&B charted singles as "If That Ain't a Reason (For Your Woman to Leave You)," "What It Is," "Tin Pan Alley" and Milton's rendition of the Charlie Rich hit of the previous year "Behind Closed Doors." "

Track listing
 If That Ain't A Reason (For Your Woman To Leave You) - 3:22
 I'm Living Off The Love You Give - 2:48
 That's What Love Will Make You Do - 3:53
 Before The Honeymoon - 3:27
 Walking The Back Streets And Crying - 5:00
 Eight Men And Four Women - 5:02
 I'm Gonna Cry A River - 3:41
 Let Me Down Easy [Recorded Live At Montreaux) - 6:35
 Rainy Day - 3:24
 Little Bluebird - 6:34
 What It Is - 3:22
 Tin Pan Alley - 3:33
 Behind Closed Doors -4:01
 Woman Across The River - 4:14
 Let Me Back In - 3:00
 If You Talk In Your Sleep - 2:45
 Packed Up And Took My Mind - 3:58

References

Stax Records albums